To See Every Bird on Earth: A Father, a Son, and a Lifetime Obsession is a book by Dan Koeppel first published in 2005.  It is about the author's relationship with his father Richard Koeppel, an obsessive "Big Lister" birdwatcher who had spotted over 7000 different species of birds at the time the book was written. The book focuses on Dan Koeppel's attempts to understand the obsession that ruled his father's life. It also examines the culture on highly competitive birders who travel the world making lists of their sightings, and discusses the history and rules of listing. Richard Koeppel was diagnosed with cancer in 2000, which curtailed his birding and forced him to switch to butterflies found locally near his home on Long Island, New York. He died of cancer-related causes on August 2, 2012.

External links
 Publisher's Official site
 Obituary, The East Hampton Star, August 15, 2012.

Birdwatching
2005 non-fiction books